MediaInfo is a free, cross-platform and open-source program that displays technical information about media files, as well as tag information for many audio and video files. It is used in many programs such as XMedia Recode, MediaCoder, eMule, and K-Lite Codec Pack. It can be easily integrated into any program using a supplied . MediaInfo supports popular video formats (e.g. Matroska, WebM, AVI, WMV, QuickTime, Real, DivX, XviD) as well as lesser known or emerging formats. In 2012 MediaInfo 0.7.57 was also distributed in the PortableApps format.

MediaInfo provides a command-line interface for displaying the provided information on all supported platforms. Additionally, a GUI for viewing the information on Microsoft Windows and macOS is provided.

Technical information

MediaInfo reveals information such as:

 General: Title, author, director, album, track number, date, duration
 Video: codec, aspect ratio, framerate, bitrate
 Audio: codec, sample rate, channels, language, bitrate
 Text: subtitle language
 Chapters: numbers of chapters, list of chapters

MediaInfo 0.7.51 and newer retrieve codec information optionally from tags or by computation. Thus in the case of misleading tags erroneous codec information may be presented.

MediaInfo installer was previously bundled with "OpenCandy". However, you were able continue the installation process without installing it. This is no more the case since April 2016.

Supported input formats

MediaInfo supports just about any video and audio file including:

 Video:  MXF, MKV, OGM, AVI, DivX, WMV, QuickTime, RealVideo, Mpeg-1, MPEG-2, MPEG-4, DVD-Video (VOB), DivX, XviD, MSMPEG4, ASP, H.264 (Mpeg-4 AVC)
 Audio: OGG, MP3, WAV, RealAudio, AC3, DTS, AAC, M4A, AU, AIFF, Opus
 Subtitles: SRT, SSA, ASS, SAMI

Supported operating systems
MediaInfo supports Microsoft Windows XP or later, macOS, Android, iOS (iPhone / iPad) Solaris and many Linux and BSD distributions. MediaInfo also provides source code so essentially any operating system or platform can be supported. An old version 0.7.60 for Windows 95 to 2000 exists.

There is a Doom9 thread for MediaInfo developers also covering simplified and modified 
implementations.

Licensing

Up to version 0.7.62 the MediaInfo library was licensed under the GNU Lesser General Public License, while GUI and CLI were provided under the terms of the GNU General Public License. Starting with version 0.7.63 the project switched to a BSD 2-clause license ("Simplified BSD License").

See also

GSpot Codec Information Appliance
FFmpeg command line tool ffprobe
ExifTool

References

External links 

 
 

Cross-platform free software
Free multilingual software
Free multimedia software
Free software programmed in C++
Metadata
Software that uses wxWidgets
Software using the BSD license